This is a list of films which have reached number one at the weekend box office in Taipei, Taiwan during 2020.

Films

See also 
 List of highest-grossing films in Taiwan

References

External links 
Taipei Weekend Box Office Chart for 2020 @movies

2020
Taipei
2020 in Taiwan